Kurt Maurer (born 1926) was a Swiss international footballer. He played in the position as midfielder.

Club football
Maurer played his youth football by FC Basel and advanced to their first team in 1945 where he played for two seasons. During his first season Basel played in the second tear of Swiss football and won promotion to the Swiss Nationalliga A. Maurer played his debut in the domestic league game in the Landhof on 9 September 1945 in the game against SC Derendingen as Basel won 2–1. He scored his first goal for the team as Basel won 7–2 in the away game against Schaffhausen. In the next season (1946–47) Maurer and his club finished the league in fourth position and reached the final of the Swiss Cup. They won the final 3–0 against Lausanne Sports in the Stadion Neufeld on 7 April 1947, with Paul Stöcklin scoring all three goals. During this period Maurer played a total of 66 games for Basel scoring only the afore mentioned goal. 45 of these games were in the domestic league, seven in the Swiss Cup and 14 were friendly games.

In the summer of 1947 Maurer moved to FC Bern, where he stayed for three seasons. At the end of the 1947–48 season Bern were relegated. But the following season they won promotion straight away, only to finish the league in last position in the next season. After these three season of ups and downs Maurer moved on to play for Urania Genève Sport, but he stayed there just one season.

Maurer returned to his home team between 1951 and 1954. During this time he played a 62 domestic league games for Basel scoring one goal. The biggest success in his career was as Basel won the championship title in Basel's 1952–53 season. In his two periods for Basel Maurer played a total of 162 games for Basel scoring a total of 5 goals. 85 of these games were in the Nationalliga A, 22 in the Nationalliga B, 15 in the Swiss Cup and 40 were friendly games. He scored two goals in the domestic league and three were scored during the test games.

For the 1954–55 Nationalliga A season Maurer moved on to La Chaux-de-Fonds. That season La Chaux-de-Fonds won the double, the championship and the Swiss Cup, but it is not clear in how many games Mauer played. He ended his football after the following season, which he played with Nordstern Basel in the Nationalliga B.

International football
In 1953 Maurer was called up to the Swiss national team. He played just one game for his country. This was on 27 June 1953 in the Rankhof Stadium against Denmark, the Danes winning 4–1.

Titles and Honours
FC Basel
 Promotion to Nationalliga A: 1945–46
 Swiss Cup winner: 1946–47
 Swiss League Champion: 1952–53

FC Bern
 Promotion to Nationalliga A: 1948–49

FC La Chaux-de-Fonds
 Swiss League Champion: 1954–55
 Swiss Cup winner: 1954–55

See also
 List of FC Basel players
 List of FC Basel seasons

References

Sources
 Rotblau: Jahrbuch Saison 2017/2018. Publisher: FC Basel Marketing AG. 
 Die ersten 125 Jahre. Publisher: Josef Zindel im Friedrich Reinhardt Verlag, Basel. 
 Verein "Basler Fussballarchiv" Homepage
 1946–47 at RSSSF
 1952–53 at RSSSF

1926 births
Possibly living people
FC Basel players
FC Bern players
Urania Genève Sport players
FC La Chaux-de-Fonds players
FC Nordstern Basel players
Swiss men's footballers
Switzerland international footballers
Association football midfielders